Philip Anyolo (born May 18, 1956, in Tongaren, Bungoma) is a Kenyan Roman Catholic Bishop who serves as Archbishop of Nairobi. He was ordained priest for the Catholic Diocese of Eldoret, Kenya, on October 15, 1983. Pope John Paul II appointed Philip Anyolo as Bishop of the Roman Catholic Diocese of Kericho on December 6, 1995. He was consecrated as bishop in Kericho on February 3, 1996. Anyolo served as the Ordinary of the Catholic Diocese of Kericho, Kenya, until March 22, 2003.

On February 20, 2002, Msgr. Philip was appointed Apostolic Administrator of the Roman Catholic Diocese of Homa Bay, upon the resignation of Rt. Rev. Linus Okok Okwach. On March 22, 2003, Pope John Paul II appointed him as the second Bishop of that diocese; he was installed on May 23, 2003.

He has served as the Chairperson of the Kenya Conference of Catholic Bishops.

He was appointed Archbishop of Kisumu on November 15, 2018 and installed on January 12, 2019.

On October 28, 2021, Pope Francis appointed him as Archbishop of Nairobi.

References

External links

1956 births
Living people
21st-century Roman Catholic archbishops in Kenya
People from Bungoma County
20th-century Roman Catholic bishops in Kenya
Roman Catholic bishops of Kericho
Roman Catholic archbishops of Kisumu
Roman Catholic bishops of Homa Bay
Kenyan Roman Catholic bishops